In the United Kingdom of Great Britain and Ireland, a Unionist ministry may refer to the following coalition governments between the Conservative Party and the Liberal Unionist Party:
 Second Salisbury ministry (1887–1892)
 Unionist government, 1895–1905

See also
 Conservative–DUP agreement
 Lib–Con pact
 United Kingdom coalition government (disambiguation)